Sir Charles Parker Butt (24 June 1830 – 26 May 1892) was an English High Court judge and a  Liberal politician who sat in the House of Commons from 1880 to 1883.

Life
Butt was the third son of the Rev. Phelpes John Butt, of Wortham Lodge, Bournemouth, and his wife Mary Eddy, daughter of Rev. John Eddy, Vicar of Toddington, Gloucestershire. He was educated privately and called to the Bar at Lincoln's Inn in 1854. He practised on the Northern Circuit and became a Q.C. in 1868.

At the 1880 general election, Butt was elected Liberal Member of Parliament (MP) for Southampton and he held the seat until 1883, when he was appointed Justice of the High Court and assigned to the Probate, Divorce and Admiralty Division, (of which he became President on 29 January 1891) and knighted.

Family
Butt married Anna Georgiana Rodewald, daughter of C. Ferdinand Rodewald of 57 Onslow Square, London, in 1878.

References 

Attribution

External links 
 

1830 births
1892 deaths
Liberal Party (UK) MPs for English constituencies
UK MPs 1880–1885
English King's Counsel
English barristers
19th-century English judges
Knights Bachelor
Probate, Divorce and Admiralty Division judges
19th-century King's Counsel
Members of the Privy Council of the United Kingdom
Presidents of the Probate, Divorce and Admiralty Division